SWAPGS may be:

SWAPGS (security vulnerability)
an X86 hardware instruction